Metopides is a genus of longhorn beetles of the subfamily Lamiinae, containing the following species:

 Metopides occipitalis Pascoe, 1866
 Metopides paradoxus Hüdepohl, 1992

References

Lamiini